Nassa francolina (common name: the Francolina Jopas), is a species of sea snail, a marine gastropod mollusk in the family Nassariidae, the nassa mud snails.

Distribution
This species occurs in the Indian Ocean off the Aldabra Atoll, Chagos and the Mascarene Basin and in the Pacific Ocean off Western Australia and Papua New Guinea.

Description

The shell size varies between 33 mm and 70 mm.

References

 Dautzenberg, Ph. (1929). Mollusques testacés marins de Madagascar. Faune des Colonies Francaises, Tome III
 Drivas, J. & M. Jay (1988). Coquillages de La Réunion et de l'île Maurice

External links
 

Muricidae
Gastropods described in 1789
Nassa (gastropod)